Fifth Avenue Historic District is an American national historic district located at Kenbridge, Lunenburg County, Virginia. It includes 63 contributing buildings in a residential area of the town of Kenbridge.  There are 39 primary residences, 16 garages, and eight sheds.  The dwellings constructed between 1890 and 1930 represent a variety of architectural styles including Queen Anne, Colonial Revival, and Bungalow.  Notable non-residential buildings include the Harris Hospital (c. 1910), Kenbridge Baptist Church (1948), Kenbridge Methodist Church (1914), and Kenbridge High School (1921), designed by noted Richmond architect Charles M. Robinson.

It was listed on the National Register of Historic Places in 2006.

References

Queen Anne architecture in Virginia
Colonial Revival architecture in Virginia
Historic districts on the National Register of Historic Places in Virginia
Buildings and structures completed in 1827
Buildings and structures in Lunenburg County, Virginia
National Register of Historic Places in Lunenburg County, Virginia
1827 establishments in Virginia